Leake ministry may refer to:

First Leake Ministry
Second Leake Ministry